Mother is a 2018 South Korean television series starring Lee Bo-young, Heo Yool, Lee Hye-young, Nam Ki-ae, and Ko Sung-hee. It is a remake of the 2010 Japanese TV series of the same title. It aired on tvN's Wednesdays and Thursdays at 21:30 (KST) time slot from January 24 to March 15, 2018.

Synopsis
A temporary teacher at an elementary school realizes that one of her students is being abused at home by her family. She makes an impulsive decision to kidnap the child and attempts to become her mother.

Cast

Main
 Lee Bo-young as Kang Soo-jin, Yoon-bok's teacher and soon adoptive mother.
 Heo Yool as Kim Hye-na/Kim Yoon-bok, one of Soo-jin's students and soon adopted daughter.
 Lee Hye-young as Cha Young-sin, Soo-jin, Yi-jin and Hyun-jin's adoptive mother.
 Choi Yoon-so as young Young-sin
 Nam Gi-ae as Nam Hong-hee, Soo-jin's birth mother.
 Ko Sung-hee as Shin Ja-young, Yoon-bok's birth mother.

Supporting

People around Soo-jin
 Lee Jae-yoon as Jung Jin-hong
 Kim Young-jae as Eun-cheol

People around Yoon-bok and Ja-young 
 Son Suk-ku as Lee Seol-ak, Ja-young's boyfriend.
 Jo Han-chul as Chang-geun

People around Young-sin
 Jeon Hye-jin as Kang Yi-jin, Soo-jin's younger sister.
 Go Bo-gyeol as Kang Hyun-jin, Soo-jin's youngest sister.
  as Detective Jae-beom
 Lee Joo-won as Tae-hoon, Yi-jin's son and Tae-mi's twin brother.
 Choi Yoo-ri as Tae-mi, Yi-jin's daughter and Tae-hoon's twin sister.

Others 
 Ye Soo-jung as Clara
 Park Sung-joon as a police officer
 Jeon Mi-do as Ra-ra
 Park Ho-san as Woon-jae, Oh-gyun's father.
 Kang Hong-seok
 Song Yoo-hyun as Song Ye-eun
 Seo Yi-sook as Madame Ra

Production
 Child actress Heo Yool was selected out of 400 candidates for the role of Kim Hye-na.
 The first four-hour script reading of the cast was held on November 1, 2017, at Studio Dragon's main office in Sangam-dong.

Original soundtrack

Part 1

Part 2

Part 3

Part 4

Part 5

Viewership

Awards and nominations

References

External links
  
 
 

Korean-language television shows
TVN (South Korean TV channel) television dramas
Television series by Studio Dragon
2018 South Korean television series debuts
South Korean television series based on Japanese television series
2018 South Korean television series endings